Baron Dries Van Noten (born 12 May 1958 in Antwerp) is a Belgian fashion designer and an eponymous fashion brand, which he co-founded with CEO and business partner Christine Mathys.

Early life and education
Van Noten was born into a family of garment makers and traders: his father owned a menswear shop and his grandfather was a tailor. He graduated from the Antwerp Academy in 1980.

Career
Van Noten freelanced for a variety of local designers before launching a menswear line in 1986. That year, he presented his first menswear collection in London as part of The Antwerp Six collective. That led to a small order from Barneys New York. Louis, Boston, was one of the first to bring Dries to USA, carrying his collection and selling it in Boston. He currently creates four collections a year (men's and women's, both for summer and winter).

In 2005, The New York Times described him as "one of fashion's most cerebral designers". His style is said to be "eccentric", and fell out of favor during the long period of minimalistic fashion in the early 1990s, only to make a comeback towards the mid-2000s, culminating with Van Noten's winning of the International Award of the Council of Fashion Designers of America in 2008.

In 2008, Van Noten dressed actress Cate Blanchett for the Academy Awards, and has continued to dress her for other red carpet events since then. Other notable customers include Queen Mathilde of Belgium, and actress Maggie Gyllenhaal. In 2018, the third episode of television show Killing Eve notably featured one of his items, known eponymously as the Dries van Noten suit.

The brand does not offer haute couture; all of its designs are ready to wear and available at retail: "I'm a little naive but I don't like the idea of showing things that you don't sell in a store", said Van Noten in a recent interview. His work is said to be characterized by use of prints, colors, original fabrics and layering. He does not advertise.

Van Noten's brand has shops in multiple locations worldwide. The first, opening in Antwerp in 1989, was "Het Modepaleis". Shop openings in Hong Kong and Tokyo followed. In early 2007, a shop was opened in Paris, decorated with antiques collected by Van Noten and his partner Patrick Vangheluwe, followed ten months later by a shop in Singapore. The brand is said to be carried in some 400 fashion shops around the world.

As the brand is a private company, not much is known about its financial affairs, although it claimed in 2007 to have annual sales of some 30 million euro. In 2018, it was acquired by family-owned Spanish fragrance and fashion firm Puig; van Noten himself remains a minority shareholder.

Legacy
The Musée des Arts Décoratifs in Paris mounted an exhibition in 2014 devoted to Van Noten's designs and their influences, which later traveled to Antwerp. The show included 180 Van Noten pieces and 100 more paintings, garments and clips from outside collections.

Honours 
2017: Created baron Van Noten by Royal order of king Philippe I.

Personal life
Van Noten and his partner Patrick Vangheluwe work and live in Antwerp. The couple resides in a house situated on a nearly seven-acre plot of land outside of the city.

References

External links
 
 The New York Times - Christine Mathys
 Christine Mathys & Dries Van Noten
 Christine Mathys & Dries Van Noten
 Christine Mathys & Dries Van Noten

1958 births
Living people
Belgian fashion designers
Businesspeople from Antwerp
LGBT fashion designers
High fashion brands
Royal Academy of Fine Arts (Antwerp) alumni
21st-century Belgian LGBT people
Puig